Florida's 10th congressional district is a congressional district in the U.S. state of Florida. It was reassigned in 2012, effective January 3, 2013, from the Gulf Coast to inland Central Florida. Before 2017, the district included parts of western Orange County, most of Lake County, as well as a northern section of Polk County. The current district is entirely within Orange County, and covers most of its western portion. It is situated along the Interstate 4 corridor. It includes most of the western half of Orlando. Other cities and towns wholly or partly within the district include Apopka, Belle Isle, Beulah, Eatonville, Harlem Heights, Ocoee, Oak Ridge, Orlo Vista, Winter Garden, and Windermere.

It is currently represented by Democrat Maxwell Frost. Due to redistricting after the 2010 census, this district was re-numbered, and slightly reconfigured from the former 8th District. Prior to 2017, it was considered a swing district with a slight Republican tilt. Due to mid-decade redistricting that occurred in 2016, the district became much more compact. It is now considered solidly Democratic.

The former 10th district, during 2003–2012, covered areas further west and encompassed much of Pinellas County, on the Gulf coast of central Florida. Barack Obama received 51% of the vote in this district in 2008.

List of members representing the district

Recent election results

1992

1994

1996

1998

2000

2002

2004

2006

2008

2010 
Bill Young won re-election over Charlie Justice with 65.9% of the vote.

2012 

Due to redistricting, the 8th district was renumbered to become the 10th district. Freshman Republican Daniel Webster sought re-election, and despite the renumbering of the district, would be considered the election's incumbent.

Val Demings, a former Chief of the Orlando Police Department and wife of the Orange County Sheriff, entered the race and won the Democratic nomination. Democrat Alan Grayson, who represented the district from 2009 until 2011, was rumored to be interested in jumping into the mix. However, he ultimately did not enter the race, and instead ran for the open seat of the new 9th district.

On election day, Webster won a fairly narrow 3.4% victory over Demings to secure re-election. Webster slightly underperformed in the district compared to the top of the ticket, where presidential candidate Mitt Romney received 53.4% of the vote.

2014 

Republican incumbent Daniel Webster ran for re-election. His Democratic opponent from 2012, Val Demings, pulled out of a possible re-match to run for Orange County Mayor instead. Ultimately, she pulled out of that race as well. Webster was unopposed in the Republican primary.

On the Democratic side, three candidates faced off in the August 26 primary. The candidates included former Eustis City Commissioner William Ferree, civil rights lawyer and Trayvon Martin family attorney Shayan Modarres, and former Navy Chief Petty Officer Mike McKenna. McKenna, a Walt Disney World security officer (49.9%) won the Democratic primary, and faced Webster in the November general election. McKenna spent only $5,000 on his primary campaign, a fraction of his two opponents.

On July 11, 2014, Florida Circuit Court Judge Terry Lewis ruled that this district, along with the neighboring minority-access District 5, was drawn to favor Republicans. On August 1, Judge Lewis gave Florida's state legislature an Aug. 15 deadline to submit new congressional maps for those two districts.

In the general election, Webster was a decided favorite, and ran only a few television ads. With very little money in his campaign funds, McKenna ran no ads, instead counting on a grass-roots, "door-to-door" campaign. Webster easily cruised to reelection by a margin of 62% to 38%.

2016 
Due to a series of court-ordered re-drawings that made the 10th district substantially more Democratic-leaning, Republican incumbent Daniel Webster announced he would instead run for the open seat of the 11th district. Webster's departure created an open-seat election for the updated 10th District, which immediately drew the interest of multiple Democrats. Val Demings won the primary, and easily won the general election.

Republican primary 
 Geoff LaGarde withdrew his name from the race on June 24 and endorsed Thuy Lowe for the nomination. Lowe was declared the nominee, and no Republican primary was held.

Democratic primary 
 Val Demings, former Orlando police chief and nominee in 2012
 Fatima Fahmy, attorney
 Bob Poe, former chair of the Florida Democratic Party
 Geraldine Thompson, state senator

Val Demings won the primary on August 30, 2016.

General election

2018 

The 10th district is centered around Orlando and the surrounding suburbs such as Lockhart, Oak Ridge, and Zellwood. Democrat Val Demings, who has represented the district since 2017, was elected with 65% of the vote in 2016. Because no write-in candidates or candidates of other parties filed to run in this district, the Democratic primary is open to all voters.

 Wade Darius, marketing firm owner
 Val Demings, incumbent

Incumbent Val Demings ran unopposed in the general election.

2020

2022

Recent election results in statewide elections

Sources 
 
 
 Congressional Biographical Directory of the United States 1774–present
 District Map at GovTrack.us

References 

10
1963 establishments in Florida